Lubomierz may refer to the following places:
Lubomierz, Bochnia County in Lesser Poland Voivodeship (south Poland)
Lubomierz, Limanowa County in Lesser Poland Voivodeship (south Poland)
Lubomierz in Lower Silesian Voivodeship (south-west Poland)